The Isuzu 6H is a family of inline-6 cylinder Diesel engine installed in Isuzu medium duty trucks, and also installed in GM medium-duty trucks as the Duramax LG4. It is mated to the Allison 2500, 3000 and 3500 Series transmissions.

Engine Specifications

6HK1/Duramax LG4
 Displacement: 
 Bore and stroke: 
 Block: gray iron
 Cylinder head: cast iron
 Fuel cutoff: 2400 rpm
 Aspiration: Turbocharged and Intercooled
 Valvetrain: SOHC, 24 Valve
 Compression: 17.5:1 (17.0:1 for  motor)

6HH1

 Displacement: 
 Bore and  Stroke: 
 Aspiration: Naturally Aspirated
 Valvetrain: OHC 24 valve
 Compression Ratio: 18.5:1 
 Injection: Reformed Bosch, Inline Injection Pump with Automatic Timer and All-Speed Mechanical Governor
 Power / Torque:  and 

6HE1

 Displacement: 
 Bore and Stroke:
 Aspiration: Naturally Aspirated and Turbocharged
 Valvetrain: Direct Injection 24 valve
 Compression Ratio: 16.9:1
 Injection: Direct Injection
 Power / Torque:  and

Engine Variants

Vehicles
 Isuzu F-Series
 Chevrolet T-Series
 Isuzu H-Series

References 

Diesel engines by model
Isuzu
General Motors engines
Straight-six engines